The South Asian Institute of Management (SAIM) is an independent management institute based in Nepal. The Institute was opened by a group of professionals who wanted to create an institute of learning, research and consultancy in the region.

While a profit-making venture, the Institute's board decided from the beginning to retain a majority proportion of profits toward institution building and the promotion of entrepreneurship, including backing any promising business ventures from its own graduates.

Sources
 Homepage
 http://www.nepalitimes.com/issue/2007/02/16/Interview/13234
 http://www.myrepublica.com/portal/index.php?action=news_details&news_id=7608

References

Universities and colleges in Nepal